Vox Records is a budget classical record label. The name is Latin for "voice."

Some Vox releases such as Peter Frankl's Debussy Piano Works and György Sándor's Complete Prokofiev Sonatas were reissued in premium vinyl boxsets by the audiophile German FSM Records Hamburg. The Brendel Complete Beethoven Sonatas has been remastered from the original tapes to SACD and for HD downloads.

History
Vox was founded in 1945 in New York by George Mendelssohn-Bartholdy, a Hungarian Jewish immigrant. Starting out with 78-rpm discs, it specialized in licensed pressings of European classical recordings. It was one of the last major recording companies to adopt stereo recording, about 1957. The company's output featured the "Vox Box", compilations of music by specific composers, such as piano music of Chopin, Tchaikovsky, and Ravel; the complete symphonies and orchestral music of Rachmaninoff; rarely heard orchestral music by Tchaikovsky, Massenet, and Rimsky-Korsakov; the complete orchestral music of the French composer Erik Satie; and one of the most complete collections of the music of the early American composer Louis Moreau Gottschalk.

Vox maintains several subsidiary labels including Turnabout and Candide. Both labels generally focus on contemporary music. In recent years, select Vox recordings were rereleased on the Excelsior label.

Although Vox specializes in imported recordings, it has also recorded the Utah Symphony Orchestra under Maurice Abravanel, the Saint Louis Symphony Orchestra under Leonard Slatkin and Walter Susskind, the Minnesota Orchestra under Stanisław Skrowaczewski, and the Cincinnati Symphony Orchestra under Thomas Schippers, Walter Susskind and Michael Gielen.

In the early 1970s, Vox and its subsidiaries issued a number of compatible quadraphonic/stereophonic recordings using the Sansui QS quadraphonic matrix system; some of the ambience can still be heard when the CD versions are played with an amplifier with Dolby decoding and four speakers. One of these was the first album made by the Atlanta Symphony Orchestra and Chorus, led by Robert Shaw, a 2-LP set entitled Nativity.

Many of its recordings were later issued on CD and saw great success with its series of budget-price Vox Boxes.  The company has continued a program of new releases, too, by such orchestras as the New Zealand Symphony Orchestra.

In 1978, the label was acquired by Moss Music Group and later managed for years by Mark Jenkins of Countdown Media. In 2018, the Vox label group was acquired by the Naxos Music Group.

Notable releases
In the course of its existence, Vox has displayed a willingness to explore unusual literature and a penchant for covering broad swaths of repertory in comprehensive releases.  Among its numerous noteworthy issues were the following:
During the 1950s, Vox released the first nominally complete cycle of Schubert's piano sonatas on records, performed by the Austrian pianist Friedrich Wührer; it omitted a few fragmentary works but did include Ernst Krenek's rarely recorded completion of the Sonata in C Major, D. 840 (Reliquie). At first issued as single records with uniform jacket art, the series later appeared in two different sets of three Vox Boxes—one, with gold covers and red labels, monaural as originally recorded and the other, with white covers and purple labels, rechanneled for ersatz stereo.  Vox subsequently replaced Wührer's cycle with one in true stereo recorded by Walter Klien; unlike its predecessor, the latter set has appeared in CD reissues as noted below.
Vox released one of the few complete recordings of Tchaikovsky's rarely heard third piano concerto, as reconstructed by Sergei Ivanovich Taneyev (1856–1915), with pianist Michael Ponti. This performance has been included in a Vox Box (released in 1991) featuring Tchaikovsky's three piano concertos and the seldom-performed Concert Fantasy, Op. 56, all performed by Ponti, with the Prague Symphony Orchestra conducted by Richard Kapp (in the first and second concertos and the fantasy) and the Orchestra of Radio Luxembourg conducted by Louis de Froment.
Vox issued recordings of the French composer Darius Milhaud directing the Luxembourg Philharmonic in his complete symphonies.
 In the 1960s pianist Frank Glazer recorded for  Vox the complete piano music of Erik Satie. This recording was declared "the finest interpretation of the piano music of Eric Satie".

Catalogue
A partial listing of Vox recordings available on vinyl, cassette, CD, DVD, and all digital platforms includes the following:

25 Classics Series
25 Baby Favorites
25 Bach Favorites
25 Ballet Favorites
25 Baroque Favorites
25 Beethoven Favorites
25 Best Selling Favorites of All Time 
25 Candlelight Favorites
25 Children's Favorites
25 Classical Christian Favorites
25 Classical Dance Favorites
25 Classical Favorites
25 Classical Heartbreakers 
25 Classical One Hit Wonders
25 Concerto Favorites
25 Guitar Favorites
25 Handel Favorites
25 Instrumental Favorites
25 Intimate Chamber Favorites
25 Light Opera Favorites
25 Marching Favorites
25 Mellow Piano Favorites
25 More Beethoven Favorites
25 More Mozart Favorites
25 Movie Favorites
25 Mozart Favorites
25 Mystical Chant Favorites
25 Opera Favorites
25 Organ Favorites
25 Piano Favorites
25 Relaxing Classics
25 Romantic Classics
25 Romantic Moods
25 Romantic Strings (25 Romantic String Favorites)
25 Sacred Choral Favorites
25 Sensual Flute Favorites 
25 Sentimental Favorites
25 Spanish Guitar Favorites
25 Strauss Favorites
25 Symphony Favorites
25 Tchaikovsky Favorites
25 Thunderous Classics
25 Tranquil Classics
25 Ultimate Classics
25 Violin Favorites
25 Vivaldi Favorites
25 Wedding Favorites
75 Greatest Classics, Volume 1
75 Greatest Classics, Volume 2
75 Greatest Classics, Volume 3
75 Greatest Classics, Volume 4
Early Romantic Piano Concertos - Clementi, Hummel, et al.
Alfred Brendel Plays Mozart with Walter Klien
Ionisation - Music of Varèse, Penderecki and Ligeti
Milhaud: 6 Little Symphonies, etc. / Milhaud, Luxembourg RSO    
Beethoven: Variations & Vignettes for Piano / Alfred Brendel  
Americana - Siegmeister, Ines, Copland, Gould, Sousa
Debussy: Solo Piano Music Vol 1 / Peter Frankl  
Romantic Piano Concerto Vol 1 / Michael Ponti  
Manuel Barrueco - 300 Years of Guitar Masterpieces
Gottschalk Festival / Eugene List, Igor Buketoff

Saint-Saëns: Complete String Concertos 
Mozart: The Complete Masonic Music / Maag, Equiluz, Rapf
Alfred Brendel plays Schubert
L'Esprit de France - The Music of Satie
Schubert: Complete Piano Sonatas Vol 1 / Walter Klien
Schubert: Complete Piano Sonatas Vol 2 / Walter Klien
Schubert: Complete Piano Sonatas Vol 3 / Walter Klien
Mozart: Piano Sonatas Vol 1 / Walter Klien
Mozart: Piano Sonatas Vol 2 / Walter Klien
Mozart: Twelve Great Piano Concertos / Klien, Brendel, et al. 
Complete Gershwin- Works for Piano & Orchestra / Siegel
Saint-Saëns: Complete Works for Piano / Dosse, Petit 
Young [Alfred] Brendel - The Vox Years
American as Apple Pie / Erich Kunzel, Cincinnati Pops
American String Quartets 1950-1970 / Concord String Quartet
20th Century Voices in America - Rochberg, Cage, Carter, etc.    
Aaron Rosand plays Ernst, Godard, Lehár, Hubay, Ysaÿe, et al. 
Abbey Simon plays Chopin: Etudes and Waltzes Complete
Alfred Brendel Plays Beethoven Piano Sonatas, Vol I
Alfred Brendel Plays Beethoven Piano Sonatas, Vol II
Alfred Brendel Plays Beethoven Piano Sonatas, Vol III 
American Composers Series - American Orchestral Music
American Composers Series - Homespun America
American Composers Series - Music of Samuel Barber
American Composers Series - The Incredible Flutist
Art of Ruggiero Ricci
Bach: 24 Preludes and Fugues, Vol 2 / Anthony Newman
Bach: Orchestral Suites, etc. / Kehr, Faerber, et al.  Box Set
Bartók: Complete Solo Piano Music / György Sándor
Beethoven: Complete Chamber Music for Flute / JP Rampal
Beethoven: Diabelli Variations, Bagatelles, etc. / Brendel
Beethoven: Piano Sonatas, Vol. 4 / Alfred Brendel
Biber: Rosary Sonatas / Lautenbacher, Ewerhart, Koch
Brahms, Mendelssohn et al. / Kalichstein-Laredo-Robinson Trio
Brahms: Complete String Quartets, etc. / Tokyo String Quartet
Brendel plays Mozart and Haydn - Piano Concertos
Chavez: The Complete Symphonies / Mata, London SO
Chopin: Complete Works for Piano / Abbey Simon
Chopin: Sonatas, Ballades, Scherzos, etc. / Abbey Simon
Concord String Quartet - Haydn, Dvořák, et al.
Spotlight Series
Spotlight on Brass
Spotlight on Keyboard
Spotlight on Percussion
Spotlight on Strings
Spotlight on Winds

References

See also
 List of record labels

American record labels
Record labels established in 1945
Classical music record labels